Ursula Brömme (9 August 1931 – 8 March 2001) was a German singer (first an alto, then a soprano) and music educator.

Life 
Born in Halle an der Saale, Brömme came from a family of craftsmen in which house concert was cultivated. She received private singing lessons and observed in the singing department of the college. In 1948 she joined the class for concert and oratorio singing. The singing teacher Kurt Wichmann recognised her talent and promoted her in the best possible way. After the artistic and pedagogical Staatsexamen, she additionally attended the opera class of the director Heinz Rückert.

In 1953, she made her debut as Emilia in Verdi's Otello at the Stralsund Theatre. She sang among others the old Burya in Jenůfa, the Countess in Der Wildschütz and Frau Reich in The Merry Wives of Windsor. A year later she received an engagement from the studio of the Berlin State Opera. From 1955 to 1959 she worked at the Meiningen Court Theatre. There she switched from alto to soprano.

She came to the attention of the Leipziger Ensemble during a guest performance of Strauss' opera Salome. In 1959, she was engaged as the first soprano at the newly emerging Opera. There she sang numerous roles, among others in Fidelio (Leonore), Carmen (title role), Un ballo in maschera (Amelia), Aida (title role), Der fliegende Holländer (Senta), Die Meistersinger von Nürnberg (Eva), Rienzi (Adriano), The Maid of Orleans (title role), Salome (title role), Die Frau ohne Schatten (Dyer), Tannhäuser (Elisabeth), Jenůfa (title role) and Lady Macbeth of the Mtsensk District (Katarina Ismailova). In 1969, she participated in the premiere of Hanell's The Greek Wedding. Guest appearances in the 1960s took her to the Semperoper Dresden, to the Bavarian State Opera Munich and the Hungarian State Opera House in Budapest. In 1985, she retired.

She also taught at the University of Leipzig and the University of Music and Theatre Leipzig. She was involved in several record productions.

Brömme died in Leipzig at the age of 69.

Awards 
In 1965, she was awarded the Art Prize of the GDR; she also held the honorary title of Kammersängerin.

Publications 
 Wir waren damals keine Stars. Kammersängerin Ursula Brömme (1931–2000) über die Eröffnung des Opernhauses. In  and Harald Müller (ed.): Oper Leipzig. Schlaglichter auf fünf Jahrzehnte Musiktheater. Theater der Zeit, Berlin 2000, pp. 176 ff.

Further reading 
 Brömme, Ursula. In Karl-Josef Kutsch, Leo Riemens: Großes Sängerlexikon. Vol. 1: Aarden – Castles. 4th, expanded and updated edition, K. G. Saur Verlag, Munich 2003, .
 Brömme, Usula. In Walter Habel (ed.):  The German Who's who. 14th edition, arani, Berlin 1965, .
 Werner Wolf: Ursula Brömme. In Ernst Krause (ed.): Opernsänger. 48 Porträts aus der Welt des Musiktheaters. 3rd, modified edition, Henschel, Berlin 1965, .

References

External links 
 

German sopranos
Voice teachers
1931 births
2001 deaths
People from Halle (Saale)